Derek Mills (born July 9, 1972) is a former American sprinter. He was a 1996 Olympic Games gold medalist in the men's 4×400 meter relay for the United States. He has a career best of 44.13 in the 400 m. After going to college at Georgia Tech in Atlanta and winning the 1994 NCAA Championship in the 400 m at Boise, Idaho, Mills ran to a #2 World Ranking behind Michael Johnson—breaking 45.00 seven times that year.

A native of Washington, D.C., Mills attended DeMatha Catholic High School in Hyattsville, Maryland.

Mills received his juris doctor from Tulane University Law School and his MBA from the Freeman School of Business at Tulane University in 2006.  He is currently an assistant track and field coach at Tulane University in New Orleans, Louisiana.

Mills is the step-father of National Football League player Odell Beckham Jr. He is married to Heather Van Mills, Beckham's mother. Who earned six-time NCAA All-American honors in Track & Field while at Louisiana State University and a long-time collegiate track coach. They have a child together named Jazmyne. He does have roots in North Carolina. He grew up visiting his third cousins on Camp Branch, Dave, Daryl, Kelly and DeWayne.

References

External links
 Derek Mills profile at IAAF
 Derek Mills  profile at USATF
 Tulane Green Wave bio

1972 births
Living people
American male sprinters
Athletes (track and field) at the 1996 Summer Olympics
Olympic gold medalists for the United States in track and field
Georgia Tech Yellow Jackets men's track and field athletes
Track and field athletes from Washington, D.C.
World Athletics Championships medalists
Medalists at the 1996 Summer Olympics
Goodwill Games medalists in athletics
Tulane Green Wave track and field coaches
World Athletics Championships winners
Competitors at the 1994 Goodwill Games